Samuel or Sam Davis may refer to:

 Samuel Davis (orientalist) (1760–1819), British orientalist and amateur artist
 Samuel Davis (politician) (1774–1831), U.S. Representative from Massachusetts
 Samuel H. Davis (civil rights leader) (1810–?), American religious and civil rights leader
 Samuel Howard Davis (1896–1921), pilot and namesake for Davis-Monthan Air Force Base 
 Samuel Post Davis (1850–1918), American journalist and politician
 Samuel W. Davis (1845–?), American Civil War sailor and Medal of Honor recipient
 Sam Davis (1842–1863), Confederate States Army soldier, "Boy Hero of the Confederacy"
 Sam Davis (American football) (1944–2019), American football player
 Sam Davis (footballer) (1890–?), English footballer
 Sammy Davis (footballer) (1900–1988), English footballer
 Sammy Davis Sr. (1900–1988), American dancer, father of Sammy Davis, Jr.
 Sammy Davis Jr. (1925–1990), American entertainer
 Sam Davis (rugby league) (born 1998), English rugby footballer

See also
 Sammy Davis (disambiguation)
 Samuel Davies (disambiguation)
 Sam Davies (disambiguation)